Chester Assembly is a former Ford manufacturing plant in Chester, Pennsylvania. It was located at Front & Lloyd Streets and occupied over 50 acres when it was open, and occupied the former Roach's Shipyard and Merchant Shipbuilding Corporation on Front Street from Fulton to Pennell streets. The factory began operations in August 1927 building the Ford Model A and was closed in  February 1961, and operations were transferred to Mahwah, New Jersey. The physical address is now known as 800 W. Front St. and is divided into several businesses. Predominantly, GWSI, M&M Industries, and Dee Paper Co. The rail lines are still in use and terminate under an awning structure within the area of the old assembly area.

External links
 Ford Chester Assembly
 Ford Truck assembly locations
 WWII Jeeps built by Ford

List of Ford factories

References

Ford factories
Former motor vehicle assembly plants
Motor vehicle assembly plants in Pennsylvania
Chester, Pennsylvania
1927 establishments in Pennsylvania
1961 disestablishments in Pennsylvania